Nuculidae is a family of small saltwater clams in the order Nuculida. Species in this family are commonly known as nut clams.

The nomenclature of the Western European species in this family is still uncertain. Their systematics have been based mainly on their feces.

Genera
 Acila H. Adams and A. Adams, 1858    
 Adrana Adams and Adams, 1858   
 Austronucula Powell, 1939
 Brevinucula Thiele, 1934
 Condylonucula D.R. Moore, 1977
 Ennucula Iredale, 1931
 Lamellinucula Schenck, 1944
 Leionucula Quenstedt, 1930 †
 Linucula Marwick, 1931
 Neonucula Lan & Lee, 2001
 Nucula Lamarck, 1799 
 Pronucula Hedley, 1902
 Sinonucula Xu, 1985
Genera brought into synonymy 
 Lionucula Thiele, 1934 synonym of Ennucula Iredale, 1931
 Nuculoma Cossmann, 1907 : synonym of Ennucula Iredale, 1931
 Polyodonta Megerle von Mühlfeld, 1811 : synonym of  Nucula Lamarck, 1799

References

 Powell A. W. B., New Zealand Mollusca, William Collins Publishers Ltd, Auckland, New Zealand 1979 
 Bieler R. & Mikkelsen P. 2006. Bivalvia – a look at the Branches. Zoological Journal of the Linnean Society, 148, 223–235
 Bieler R., Carter J.G. & Coan E.V. (2010). Classification of Bivalve families. pp. 113–133, in: Bouchet P. & Rocroi J.-P. (2010), Nomenclator of Bivalve Families. Malacologia 52(2): 1-184.. American Malacologists: Melbourne, FL (USA). . XII, 195 pp.
 Vaught, K.C. (1989). A classification of the living Mollusca

 
Taxa named by John Edward Gray
Bivalve families
Extant Paleozoic first appearances